From February 1992 until March 1993, Colombia suffered rolling blackouts of up to 10 hours a day due to a particularly strong El Niño season, which dried the reservoirs in hydroelectric plants in a country deriving 70% of its energy output from hydroelectric sources; consequently, the government decided to use DST to help save electricity. The experiment failed to deliver the intended results, possibly due to Colombia's low latitude, and the DST experiment was discontinued.

See also
Daylight saving time by country
1992 Colombian energy crisis

References

Colombia
Time in Colombia